The  Murrum Silli Dam or Babu Chhotelal Shrivastav Dam, also spelled Madam Silli and Mordem Silli, is an earth-fill embankment dam on the Sillari River, a tributary of the Mahanadi in central eastern India. It was built under the supervision of British Raj governor Madam Silli for whom it was originally named. It is located in Dhamtari District of Chhattisgarh. Built between 1914 and 1923, it is the first dam in Asia to have siphon spillways. Madamsilli is about 95 km from Raipur. It is one of the most prominent architectural marvels in Chhattisgarh. Its primary purpose is irrigation.

On 3 June 1929 R.S. Rajendranath Sur (government civil engineer, Central province) was awarded by George V the title of "Rai Saheb" for his exemplary works on Murrum Silli Dam.

References

Dams in Chhattisgarh
Earth-filled dams
Dhamtari district
Dams completed in 1923
1923 establishments in India
20th-century architecture in India